Rose Terrace may refer to:

Rose Terrace (Evansville, Indiana), United States
Rose Terrace (Grosse Point Farms, Michigan), Anna Dodge's mansion near Detroit, United States
Rose Terrace (Perth, Scotland), Georgian street in Perth, Scotland
Rose Terrace (Staunton, Virginia), United States